The list of ship launches in 1950 includes a chronological list of all ships launched in 1950.


References

Sources

1950
Ship launches